The 1991 Ohio State Buckeyes football team represented the Ohio State University in the 1991 NCAA Division I-A football season. The Buckeyes compiled an 8–4 record, including the 1992 Hall of Fame Bowl in Tampa, Florida, where they lost, 24–17, to the Syracuse Orangemen.

For the game against Northwestern, Ohio State played away against Northwestern in Cleveland.

Schedule

Roster

Game summaries

Iowa

Coaching staff
 John Cooper - Head Coach (4th year)
 Bobby April - Defensive Backs (1st year)
 Larry Coyer - Defensive Backs (3rd year)
 Joe Hollis - Offensive Line (1st year)
 Ron Hudson - Quarterbacks (4th year)
 Gene Huey - Offensive Wide Receivers (4th year)
 Bob Palcic - Offensive Line (6th year)
 Fred Pagac - Defensive Linebackers (10th year)
 Elliot Uzelac - Offensive Coordinator (1st year)
 Bill Young - Defensive Coordinator (4th year)

1992 NFL draftees

References

Ohio State
Ohio State Buckeyes football seasons
Ohio State Buckeyes football